Pennybacker may refer to:

People
 Isaac S. Pennybacker (1805–1847), American judge and politician
 Percy Pennybacker (1895–1963), American civil engineer
 Anna Pennybacker (1861–1938), American educator and women's rights activist
 Flora Pennybacker (born 1963), married name of British artist Flora McDonnell

Other uses
 Pennybacker Bridge across Lake Austin in Austin, Texas, U.S.

See also
 Penny Baker
 Penny Barker
 Pennypacker (disambiguation)